Crusha is a brand of milkshake mix, sold in the United Kingdom. The brand first appeared in 1955, and was bought by British Sugar. In December 2001, it came under the Silver Spoon brand. Crusha is often the milkshake of choice in cafés. However, it is also sold in shops, for home mixing in bottles, of from 250ml to 1l in size.

History

Early History
Crusha was originally sold in glass bottles, but was later changed to plastic. Crusha is sold in many different flavours, the first four flavours being chocolate, banana, strawberry and raspberry. Flavours like Lemon, Lime and pineapple were also available.

2003 Relaunch (2003-2006)
In 2003, the brand gained notable attention when web animator Joel Veitch animated an advert for the brand that featured cats playing musical instruments, including a ginger cat named Errol singing, and cows getting crushed under bottles of the product. Music for the commercials was provided by Mammoth Music. During October of that year, British Sugar admitted a secret plot to clear faulty milkshakes from Tesco, without telling the company. That year, new flavours Vanilla and Black Cherry were added to the lineup, alongside the returning flavours Lime and Pineapple.

For 2005, Pineapple and Black Cherry were replaced with two new flavours: white chocolate and a tropical fruit variant named "Wild'n'Fruity". In October 2005, No Added Sugar versions of Strawberry and Banana were introduced.

2007 Refresh (2007-2011)
In Early 2007, Crusha was rebranded with a new logo and with reformulated "Nothing Artificial" versions of their reduced range of flavours, consisting of Raspberry, Strawberry, Banana, Chocolate and White Chocolate. In August 2007, after receiving thousands of complaints from dismayed customers, about the wildly different taste of the new 'Nothing Artificial' version of Strawberry Crusha, it was confirmed that they would revert to the old recipe. The White Chocolate variety was later discontinued.

On 22 January 2008, a No Added Sugar variation of the Raspberry flavour was introduced. Joel Veitch produced another advert campaign, this time showing the cats inside a gym, with cows on treadmills getting Crushed by bottles of the product, with eventually the main cat singer Errol, (who has become black and white) getting crushed as well.

In December 2009, after several campaigns, it was announced that Lime Crusha would return, and would do so on 6 March 2010 at Morrisons and Waitrose stores. It rapidly established itself as its highest selling flavour. A new advert was also made, featuring the Crusha cats disco rolling, with Errol getting crushed by a bottle once again. Lime Crusha was regarded as something of a 'cult drink', and for a time was not stocked by many shops, due to low customer demand.

Expansion to desserts (2011-2014)
In 2011, the Crusha brand was extended to a range of desserts, including Puddings and Jelly. The Milkshake Mix was rebranded as Crusha Mixa, and the Vanilla flavour returned as a limited Edition flavour, now as Vanilla Ice Cream. Banana Crusha was discontinued in shops, but remained a bulk product for cash and carry stores.

For 2012, a new limited-edition flavour was released, Cherry and Vanilla, which replaced the Vanilla Ice Cream flavour. Another advert was broadcast that year, featuring Errol and his cats breakdancing, with cows on skateboards getting crushed by a bottle at the end. In 2013, Apple & Blackcurrant replaced the Cherry and Vanilla flavour.

Crusha Time (2014-present)
On 5 March 2014, Crusha rebranded fully, scrapping "Errol's Crew" and giving Errol a younger appearance, with kittens doing stunts to make Crusha. The flavour selection rebranded to just raspberry, strawberry and chocolate, with a new No Added Sugar version of the chocolate flavour.

In 2016, Vanilla returned as a no added sugar flavour, without any sugar version.

In 2019, Crusha introduced a limited edition no-added-sugar Cookies & Cream flavour to the product family.

In 2020, The Lime flavour was reintroduced as a limited edition product, with it being available in No Added Sugar for the first time.

Flavours

Current
Strawberry (no added sugar)
 Raspberry (no added sugar)
 Chocolate (no added sugar)
 Cookies & Cream (no added sugar)
 Lime (no added sugar, limited edition)
 Strawberry (Full sugar, Cash and Carry only)
 Raspberry (Full sugar, Cash and Carry only)
 Banana (Full sugar, Cash and Carry only)

Former
 Apple and Blackcurrant (Limited Edition 2013)
 Banana (no added sugar)
 Black Cherry
 Caramel
 Cherry and Vanilla (Limited Edition 2012)
 Lemon
 Lime
 Pineapple
 Toffee
 Vanilla
 Vanilla (no added sugar)
 Vanilla Ice Cream (Limited Edition 2011)
 WildNFruity
 White Chocolate

References

External links

Brand name dairy products
Flavored milk